Sultanah Maliha binti Almarhum Tengku Ariff (née Tengku Maliha binti Almarhum Tengku Ariff, born 13 April 1949) is wife of Sallehuddin of Kedah and the current Sultanah of Malaysian State of Kedah replacing her sister-in-law, Sultanah Haminah Hamidun. She proclaimed as the Sultanah of Kedah on 30 April 2018 in a royal ceremony after her husband was made Sultan of Kedah. She is the mother to Tengku Sarafudin Badlishah and Tunku Shazuddin Ariff.

Biography
Born as Tengku Maliha, she is the third children of seven siblings to Tengku Sri Jaya Raja Tengku Ariff bin Tengku Long Abdul Rahman and Cik Puan Sri Jaya Raja Datin Kitty Lind. She was a member of Kelantanese Royal Family with Sultan Yahya Petra as her grand uncle.

She obtained her early education at St. Mary Primary School, Kuala Lumpur and then at Assunta Satu Primary School before she went to Assunta Secondary School, Petaling Jaya. At that time, her father was a pilot in KLM which is a flag carrier airline company of the Netherlands. In 1960, she with her family returned to Kota Bharu, Kelantan after her father served as the aide-de-camp to Almarhum Sultan Yahya Petra ibni Almarhum Sultan Ibrahim, the then Sultan of Kelantan.

After returned to Kota Bharu, she continued her study at Raja Perempuan Zainab (I) Secondary School and she was very active in her school sport activities especially in hockey. She also took part in school debate club and once presenting her school in a state's English debate competition.

Interest
Sultanah Maliha cares and is involved in the education development of the people especially in Kedah and is keen the development of the English Language. As such, she was appointed as the royal patron of English Literacy and Computer Programme (COMEL), managed by State Government Education Department and National University of Malaysia. Sultanah Maliha is also a cat lover and passionate in cooking, especially Malaysian East Coast cuisines.

Raja Puan Muda Kedah
She proclaimed as the Raja Puan Muda Kedah (equivalent to Crown Princess) replaced Tengku Raudzah after her husband was proclaimed as DYTM Raja Muda Kedah (Crown Prince of Kedah) on 15 December 2016. Her husband replaced Tunku Abdul Malik, who died of natural causes on 29 November 2015 at Sultanah Bahiyah Hospital in Alor Setar.

Sultanah of Kedah
Maliha is made the Sultanah of Kedah after her husband proclaimed as the new Sultan of Kedah following the death of her brother-in-law, Sultan Abdul Halim in September 2017. Her official proclamation as Sultanah held on 30 April 2018 with full of royal ceremony at Anak Bukit Palace, Alor Setar. The ceremony was attended by members of Kedah Royal Family, Kedahan statesmen, the then Chief Minister of Kedah and wife, some members of Kedah State Executive Council with their spouses. The ceremony began at 11 morning upon the arrival of Sultan Sallehuddin accompanied by Sultanah Maliha to the throne hall(known as the Bailarong Seri). After the arrival, the sultanah proclamation letter read by the Chief Minister of Kedah, Ahmad Bashah Md Hanipah in front of the Sultan following by Sultanah Maliha stood and kissed her husband's hand as symbol of the junjung duli ceremony. Then, the ceremony continued by 21 shots of canon accompanied by royal nobat(traditional music). The ceremony end with the Sultan and Sultanah along with royal family members left the throne hall.

Like many spouses of heads of state, as the Sultanah of Kedah, she has no stipulated role or duties in the Kedah State Constitution. However, she accompanies the Sultan of kedah to official functions and state visits, as well as hosting visiting heads of state and their spouses. For example, she accompanied her husband to the Installation of the 16th Yang Di-Pertuan Agong Ceremony at the National Palace on 30 July 2019.

Honours

Awards and Recognitions
  Most Illustrious Royal Family Order of Kedah (DK, 21.1.2018)
 Order of Loyalty to Sultan Sallehuddin (SSSK, 30.4.2018) with title Dato' Seri Diraja
  Grand Commander of the Illustrious Order of Loyalty to Sultan Abdul Halim Mu'adzam Shah (SHMS, 15.1.2017) with title Dato' Seri Diraja
  Knight Grand Companion of the Order of Loyalty to the Royal House of Kedah (SSDK, 12.12.2011) with title Dato' Seri
  Knight Companion of the Order of Loyalty to the Royal House of Kedah (DSDK, 2001) with title Dato'
  Companion of the Order of Loyalty to the Royal House of Kedah (SDK)
 Sultan Abdul Halim Shah Silver Jubilee Medal (1983) 
 Sultan Abdul halim Shah Golden Jubilee Medal (2008)

Places named after her
 Sultanah Maliha Hospital, Langkawi, Kedah

Issue

Ancestry

See also
 Sultanate of Kedah 
 List of Sultanahs of Kedah
 Chief Ministers of Kedah

References

1949 births
Living people
Kedah royal consorts